Farruko, a Puerto Rican singer and songwriter, has received various awards and nominations including two Billboard Latin Music Awards, two Latin Grammy Awards and six Premios Lo Nuestro, among others.

In 2010, he released his first studio album El Talento del Bloque, followed by The Most Powerful Rookie in 2012 and Farruko Presenta: Los Menores in 2014, the latter two were nominated for the Latin Grammy Award for Best Urban Music Album. In 2013, he achieved significant commercial success with the song "6 AM", alongside Colombian singer J Balvin, the song won Urban Song of the Year and Urban Collaboration of the Year at the Premio Lo Nuestro 2015 and received two Latin Grammy Award nominations.

His fourth album, Visionary, was released in 2015 and was also nominated for the Latin Grammy Award for Best Urban Music Album, being Farruko's third nomination in the category. In 2016, he won the Latin Grammy Award for Best Urban Song as one of the songwriters of Yandel's "Encantado". His following albums were TrapXficante (2017), Gangalee (2019) and En Letra de Otro (2019).

In 2018, he participated in the remix for Pedro Capó's "Calma", the song was a huge commercial success and received various awards and nominations, it was nominated for six Billboard Latin Music Awards winning Latin Pop Song of the Year, it also won the Latin Grammy Award for Best Urban Fusion/Performance.

His eighth album, La 167, was released in 2021, it includes the successful single "Pepas", the song was nominated for Top Latin Song at the 2022 Billboard Music Awards and Song of the Year at the Premio Lo Nuestro 2022.

Awards and nominations

References

Farruko